Bruner Run is a  long 1st order tributary to the Youghiogheny River in Fayette County, Pennsylvania.  This is the only stream of this name in the United States.

Variant names
According to the Geographic Names Information System, it has also been known historically as:
Haney Run

Course
Bruner Run rises about 4 miles west-southwest of Stewarton, Pennsylvania, and then flows north and turns east to join the Youghiogheny River about 0.5 miles northwest of Stewarton.

Watershed
Bruner Run drains  of area, receives about 48.4 in/year of precipitation, has a wetness index of 332.58, and is about 96% forested.

See also
List of rivers of Pennsylvania

References

Tributaries of the Youghiogheny River
Rivers of Pennsylvania
Rivers of Fayette County, Pennsylvania